Parliamentary elections were held in Morocco on 25 June 1993, having originally been scheduled for October 1990, but postponed due to issues over the future of Western Sahara and a referendum on a new constitution, which took place in 1992. The number of directly elected seats increased from 204 to 222, whilst the number of indirectly elected seats rose from 102 to 111 (69 elected by Communal Councils, 15 by the Chamber of Agriculture, 10 by the Chamber of Commerce & Industry, 7 by the Chamber of Craftspeople and 10 by the Chamber of Labor Unions). The indirectly elected seats were chosen on 17 September.

Eleven parties and 2,042 candidates (including 167 independents) contested the election. The result was a victory for the Socialist Union of Popular Forces, which won 48 of the elected seats. Voter turnout was 62.7%. For the first time, women were elected, with Latifa Bennani-Smires and Badia Skalli becoming the first female members of the House of Representatives.

Results

References

Morocco
1993 in Morocco
Elections in Morocco
June 1993 events in Africa
Election and referendum articles with incomplete results